Gulf Bank is one of the largest leading banks in Kuwait with a broad offering of consumer banking, wholesale banking, treasury, and financial services. The Bank was founded in 1960, registered as a bank with the Central Bank of Kuwait and was listed as Gulf Bank (GBK) on the Kuwait Stock Exchange (Boursa Kuwait) in 1984.
 
Gulf Bank has a large network of 58 branches, with total assets of KD 6 billion (US$19.8 billion) for year ended 31 December 2018. The Bank is currently ranked 'A' by four leading international credit rating agencies; a Long-term Issuer Default Rating of “A+” with a “Stable” Outlook by Fitch Ratings, an Issuer Credit rating at “A-/A-2” with a “Stable” outlook by S&P Global Rating, a Long-Term Deposits Rating of “A3” with a “Positive” Outlook by Moody's Investor Services and a Long-term Foreign Currency Rating of “A+” with a “Stable” Outlook by Capital Intelligence Ratings.

Gulf Bank has been recognized with numerous awards, spread over different sectors of its work, including consumer banking, wholesale banking, products, performance, marketing, human resources, and its corporate social responsibility program.

Gulf Bank is strongly committed to giving back to Kuwait and society through its Sustainability and corporate social responsibility program. The Bank supports numerous events focusing on youth, education, health and fitness, helping the underprivileged, women's empowerment, as well as promoting Kuwait's heritage and culture.

History

Gulf Bank was founded in 1960, and commenced business operations in a rented flat on Fahad Al-Salem Street in Kuwait City with a total of 50 employees and a capital of 24 million rupees, equivalent to  KD 1.8 million (US$6 million). The Bank received permission from the Kuwait municipality in 1961, to construct its headquarters and was initially granted permission to build up to four floors and an optional basement. Over the years, additional floors were constructed in the headquarters, but care was taken to maintain the original architecture and design of the building whereby maintaining its historic look and keeping to its early roots. The Bank's Headquarters is considered to be one of Kuwait City's landmarks.

Latest bank results
Gulf Bank recorded a net profit of KD 48 million for the year ending 2017, an increase of 12% over the previous year. Our loan portfolio quality continued to improve as non-performing loans (NPLs) declined to KD73 million or 1.7% of total loans compared to KD93 million or 2.4% at the end of 2016. Coverage of non-performing loans was 414% by the end of 2017. 

The Bank continues to enjoy a strong capital adequacy ratio of 17.8%, which is well above the regulatory requirement of 14%. The assets of the Bank grew by 4% to KD5,683 million, while total shareholders’ equity was up 5% to KD601 million. Gross Customer loans ended the year at KD4,060 million, an increase of 8% over the prior year-end period.

In terms of profitability, the Bank's earnings per share for the year ending 2017 was 17 fils, compared to 15 fils for the year ending 2016. The return on average assets was 0.86% compared to 0.78% in 2016, and the return on average equity was 8.3% compared to 7.8% for the previous year.

In response to the Bank's ongoing positive performance, the Board of Directors has recommended a cash dividend of 9 fils
per share, an increase of 29% over the cash dividend of 7 fils that was distributed last year.

Board of directors
Jasem Mustafa Boodai (chairman)

Ali Morad Yusuf Behbehani (deputy chairman)

Bader Nasser Al Khorafi (board member)

Omar Hamad Youssef Al-Essa (board member)

Fawaz Mohammed Al-Awadhi (board member)

Sayer Bader Al-Sayer (board member)

Executive management
Antoine Daher (chief executive officer)

David Challinor (chief financial officer)

Farhan Mahmood (chief risk officer)

Hussam Sulieman Mustafa (chief internal auditor and general manager - internal audit)

Sami Mahfouz (general manager - treasury)

Mona Mansour (general manager - customer service delivery)

Nabil B. Abdel-Malek (general manager - legal affairs and general counsel)

Salma AlHajjaj (general manager - human resources)

Vikram Issar (general manager - consumer banking)

Raghunandan S Menon (acting deputy CEO)

Ahmad Khalid AlDuwaisan (general manager - corporate banking)

Dari AlBader (general manager - corporate affairs)

External links
 Official Website

References
http://www.e-gulfbank.com/eng/aboutUs/overview/index.jsp?t=1494140620234
 http://www.e-gulfbank.com/eng/aboutUs/newsroom/archivedNews.jsp?t=1494140633127
 http://www.e-gulfbank.com/eng/aboutUs/boardOfDirectors/index.jsp?t=1494140639948
 http://www.e-gulfbank.com/eng/aboutUs/executiveManagement/index.jsp?t=1494140646158
 http://www.e-gulfbank.com/eng/images/Signed%20FS-31%20Dec%2016-English-ch%5B2%5D_tcm21-65741.pdf?t=1485873697596

Banks of Kuwait
Banks established in 1960
Companies based in Kuwait City
Kuwaiti companies established in 1960
Companies listed on the Boursa Kuwait